The 28th Grey Cup was played as a two-game series with the first game played on November 30, 1940, before 4,998 fans at Varsity Stadium in Toronto. The second game was played on December 7, 1940, with cold weather and snow contributing to a small attendance of 1,700 fans, at Lansdowne Park in Ottawa. This two-game series format was set up as a result of the Canadian Rugby Union disallowing the Winnipeg Blue Bombers the right to play in the title game due to a rule dispute. Consequently, what would have been the Eastern Final game became a two-game Grey Cup series.

The Ottawa Rough Riders defeated the Toronto Balmy Beach Beachers by a total-points score of 20–7.

External links
 
 
 
 

Grey Cup
Grey Cup
Grey Cups hosted in Toronto
Grey Cups hosted in Ottawa
1940 in Ontario
November 1940 sports events
1940s in Toronto
1940s in Ottawa
Ottawa Rough Riders
December 1940 sports events